1927 is the self-titled album by the Australian pop rock band, 1927 released in November 1992. It reached No. 40 on the ARIA albums chart.

Track listing

Charts

Personnel 

Eric Weideman – vocals, guitar, keyboards
Bill Frost – bass, vocals
Dave Dwyer – guitar, vocals, keyboards
Phillip Campbell – drums

References

1992 albums
1927 (band) albums
Albums produced by Mark Opitz
Warner Music Group albums